Oliver Clark Askew (born December 12, 1996) is an American-Swedish race car driver who races under the American flag. He previously competed in the Formula E World Championship for Avalanche Andretti Formula E. He is the 2019 Indy Lights champion.

Personal life
Oliver Askew was born in Melbourne, Florida and raised in Jupiter. With his mother hailing from Sweden, Askew is bilingual in Swedish. Throughout his career, Askew frequently raced alongside friend and fellow Jupiter native Kyle Kirkwood.

Racing career

Early career
Askew began karting at the age of 8 in Jupiter. In 2016, Askew was selected as a Team USA Scholarship recipient. This enabled him to compete in the Formula Ford Festival and Walter Hayes Trophy. In the Walter Hayes Trophy, Askew won his heat and finished second in the final. Later in 2016, he won the $200,000 2016 Mazda Road to Indy Shootout at Mazda Raceway Laguna Seca to compete in the 2017 USF2000 championship.

USF2000
Askew won the 2017 USF2000 championship. The win earned him a $400,000 scholarship from Mazda to race in the 2018 Pro Mazda series, the middle step on the Mazda Road to Indy ladder system to IndyCar racing. In May 2017, Askew joined the Rising Star Racing program which attempts to aid young American open-wheel drivers advance in their careers.

Pro Mazda
In February 2018, Askew signed with Cape Motorsports to drive in the 2018 Pro Mazda series. Askew scored his first Pro Mazda victory in Race 1 at Portland. He finished the 2018 season third in the Pro Mazda championship.

Indy Lights
In September 2018, Askew partook in the Chris Griffis Memorial Test with Andretti Autosport. In February 2019, Andretti confirmed Askew would race with them in the forthcoming championship.
Askew won the 2019 Indy Lights championship, clinching at WeatherTech Raceway Laguna Seca. In winning the championship, Askew has been awarded a scholarship which guarantees him an entry into a minimum of three races in the 2020 IndyCar Series, including the Indianapolis 500.

IndyCar
In July 2019, Askew joined the Portland test with Chip Ganassi Racing. On October 28, 2019, Arrow McLaren SP announced that Askew, alongside Patricio O'Ward, would race full-time for the team in 2020. A hard crash at the 2020 Indianapolis 500 left Askew with concussion-like symptoms; after racing the next four events, Askew sought treatment and was withdrawn from the harvest Grand Prix rounds. He was later cleared to return for the season finale. On October 12, AMSP dropped Askew in advance of 2021 without giving a reason why.

Askew returned to IndyCar with AMSP for the second race of the Detroit Grand Prix, standing in for the injured Felix Rosenqvist after the latter crashed heavily during the first race. He raced with Ed Carpenter Racing at the following race at Road America in place of the injured Rinus VeeKay.

In July 2021 Askew tested with Rahal Letterman Lanigan Racing at Barber Motorsports Park alongside Danish Formula 2 driver Christian Lundgaard. He later signed to drive the third Rahal entry for the final three races of the season. Askew's three race run with the team was mixed. He recorded a top ten finish and a RLL's only Fast Six qualifying slot on a road or street course at Laguna Seca but was caught up in accidents at Portland and Long Beach. He also caused significant damage to the #45 car in a crash in qualifying at Long Beach. Ultimately RLL chose Christian Lundgaard to drive the third RLL car full time in 2022, ending Askew's chances with the team.

Sports car career
In January 2021, Askew made his sports car racing debut at the 24 Hours of Daytona driving for Riley Motorsports in the LMP3 class. Askew would go on to win the race in that class.

Formula E 
In November 2021, it was announced that Askew would reunite with Andretti to partake in his rookie season of Formula E the following year, partnering Jake Dennis. He managed to score his first points in Formula E on his debut, after finishing 9th at the Diriyah ePrix.

Askew departed Andretti after just one season, his seat was taken by André Lotterer despite he was the rookie of the year. Askew left the series following the season after being unable to secure a seat. 

During the 2023 season, Askew would become a commentator for the Formula E broadcasting team, accompanying former Formula E Champion Nelson Piquet Jr and Naomi Schiff, starting with the Mexico City ePrix.

Racing record

Career summary

* Season still in progress.

American open–wheel racing results

U.S. F2000 National Championship

Pro Mazda Championship

Indy Lights

IndyCar Series
(key)

* Season still in progress.

Indianapolis 500

Complete IMSA SportsCar Championship results
(key) (Races in bold indicate pole position; races in italics indicate fastest lap)

† Points only counted towards the Michelin Endurance Cup, and not the overall LMP3 Championship.
* Season still in progress.

Complete Formula E results
(key) (Races in bold indicate pole position; races in italics indicate fastest lap)

References

External links
  
 

1996 births
American racing drivers
American people of Swedish descent
Formula Ford drivers
Living people
Racing drivers from Florida
U.S. F2000 National Championship drivers
Indy Pro 2000 Championship drivers
Indy Lights champions
Indy Lights drivers
IndyCar Series drivers
Indianapolis 500 drivers
WeatherTech SportsCar Championship drivers
24 Hours of Daytona drivers
Andretti Autosport drivers
Arrow McLaren SP drivers
Ed Carpenter Racing drivers
Rahal Letterman Lanigan Racing drivers
Formula E drivers
Formula Masters China drivers